Nakh may refer to:

 Nach (Bible acronym) (NaKh), an acronym for Nevi'im Ksuvim/Ktuvim (the Prophets and (Holy) Writings of Tanach)
 Nakh languages, a group of languages within Northeast Caucasian, spoken chiefly by the Chechens and Ingush in the North Caucasus within Southern Russia
 Nakh peoples, the group of peoples who speak the Nakh languages
 Nakh Mountain, Hormozgan, Iran; a mountain

See also

 Nach (disambiguation)
 
 Knack (disambiguation)
 Nack (disambiguation)
 NAC (disambiguation)
 Nak (disambiguation)
 Naq (disambiguation)